Abraham Haas (1847–August 8, 1921) was an American businessman, co-founder of the Hellman, Haas & Co. (which became Smart & Final), and patriarch of the Haas family.

Biography
Haas was born to a Jewish family in Reckendorf, Kingdom of Bavaria in 1847 and immigrated to Portland, Oregon at the age of 16 where he worked at a grocery store founded by his cousins, Charles, Samuel, and Kalman Haas. He then moved to Los Angeles where he co-founded the retail drug and grocery store, Hellman, Haas and Company with his brother, Jacob, and partners, Herman W. Hellman (brother of banker Isaias W. Hellman) and Bernard Cohn (later the Mayor of Los Angeles). Using his profits, he founded the first flour milling and cold storage businesses in Los Angeles, the Capital Milling Company, as well as several electricity and gas companies. In the 1880s, Jacob Baruch bought out the other partners and the company changed its name to Haas, Baruch & Co. in 1889. The company pioneered the "cash & carry" concept in Los Angeles (before clerks would gather the groceries for the customers) and by 1895, benefiting from rapid population growth in the region thanks to the building of the Los Angeles aqueduct, the discovery of oil in Long Beach, and the opening of the Panama Canal, the company had $2 million in sales. Haas became one of the leading philanthropists in the city at the time. He moved to San Francisco in 1900 where he founded Haas Wholesale Grocers and also served as a director for Wells Fargo Bank, the San Francisco Savings & Loan Company, the California Insurance League, and the Union Sugar Company.

Haas was a benefactor of the Eureka Benevolent Society (later the Jewish Family Service), the Federation of Jewish Charities, and the Pacific Orphans’ Asylum and Home Society.

Personal life
Haas married Fanny Koshland, daughter of Simon Koshland, one of the leading wool merchants in San Francisco, with whom he had four children: Charles Haas (b. 1888), Walter A. Haas Sr. (b. 1889) (married to Elise Stern, daughter of Sigmund Stern, the nephew of Levi Strauss, and granddaughter of David Stern), Ruth Haas Lilienthal (b. 1891) (married to Philip N. Lilienthal Jr., son of banker Philip N. Lilienthal and grandson of rabbi Max Lilienthal), and Eleanor Haas Koshland (b. 1900) (married to her cousin Daniel E. Koshland Sr., the son of her maternal uncle, Marcus Koshland).

References

American company founders
Haas family
1847 births
1921 deaths
Bavarian emigrants to the United States
Businesspeople from California
People from Reckendorf
Koshland family
Burials at Home of Peace Cemetery (Colma, California)